Results from Norwegian football in 1924.

Class A of local association leagues
Class A of local association leagues (kretsserier) is the predecessor of a national league competition.

1The following season, Kristiania local association changed its name to Oslo.
2The following season, Nord-Trøndelag local association split into Namdal and Nord-Trøndelag.

Norwegian Cup

Third round
Falk - Aalesund 0-1

Strømsgodset - Brage 1-0 (extra time)

Brann - Frigg 3-2

Gjøvik/Lyn - Brodd 3-1

Larvik Turn - Drafn 1-0

Mjøndalen - Kvik (Trondhjem) 6-0

Odd - Storm 4-0

Urædd - Pors 0-0 (extra time)

Rematch

Pors - Urædd 1-3

Quarter-finals
Gjøvik/Lyn - Aalesund 3-2 (extra time)

Strømsgodset - Brann 0-1

Mjøndalen - Larvik Turn 3-0

Urædd - Odd 1-3

Semi-finals
Mjøndalen - Brann 2-1

Odd - Gjøvik/Lyn 2-1

Final
October 2: Odd - Mjøndalen 3-0

National team

Sources:

References

 
Seasons in Norwegian football
, Norwegian